24th Street/Jefferson station and 24th Street/Washington station are a pair of light rail stations on the Valley Metro Rail in Phoenix, Arizona, United States. They are the thirteenth stop westbound and the sixteenth stop eastbound on the initial  starter line.

Ridership

Notable places nearby
 Greyhound bus terminal (3 blocks south)
 Maricopa Medical Center
 Arizona State Hospital

References

External links
 Valley Metro map

Valley Metro Rail stations in Phoenix, Arizona
Railway stations in the United States opened in 2008
2008 establishments in Arizona